Kashmiri Gate, Lahore (Kashmiri Darwaza) is one of the thirteen gates of Walled City of Lahore in Lahore, Pakistan. The gate gets its name as it faces in the direction of Kashmir. Inside there is a shopping area and market that is called "Kashmiri Bazaar" and a girls' college. This college, built upon an old haveli belonging to a Shah, is a beautiful example of Mughal architecture.

Gallery

See also 
 Lahore
 Lahore Fort
 Walled City of Lahore
 Badshahi Mosque

References

External links 

 Walled City Has thirteen gates

Gates of Lahore